Edward Bligh may refer to:
Edward Bligh (British Army officer) (1769–1840), lieutenant-general in the British Army, Irish politician, amateur cricketer and member of the Marylebone Cricket Club
Edward Bligh, 2nd Earl of Darnley (1715–1747), Irish peer
Edward Bligh, 5th Earl of Darnley (1795–1835), British peer and politician
Edward Bligh, 7th Earl of Darnley (1851–1900), English landowner and cricketer
Edward Bligh (cricketer, died 1872) (c. 1800–1872), Irish landowner and cricketer
Edward Vesey Bligh (1829–1908), English cricketer, diplomat and clergyman

See also
Ned Bligh (1864–1892), American baseball player